Long intergenic non-protein coding RNA 273 is a protein that in humans is encoded by the LINC00273 gene.

References

Further reading